Areces is a surname. Notable people with the surname include:

 Alberto Areces (born 1970), Spanish sports shooter
 Carlos Areces (born 1976), Spanish actor, singer, and comics artist
 Ramón Areces (1904–1989), Spanish businessman
 Vicente Álvarez Areces (born 1947), Spanish politician